Michael 'Mick' A Shea (born 1939), is a male former cyclist who competed for England.

Cycling career
Shea represented England at international level during the 1960s. He won the silver medal at the 1964 British National Road Race Championships.

He was selected for England in the road race, at the 1966 British Empire and Commonwealth Games in Kingston, Jamaica.

He was a member of the Hemel Hempstead Cycling Club before turning professional and joining the Holdsworth-Campognolo team.

In addition to his international appearances he won the British classic race known as the Archer Grand Prix.

Notable Results

1960 - 1st in Archer R.C. Junior Road Race, Hillingdon, London

1962 - 45th in General Classification Tour of Britain, (Milk Race), Blackpool

1963 - 1st in Archer Grand Prix, Beaconsfield, London,

1963 - 1st in Lester Young Memorial, Borehamwood, Hertfordshire.

1963 - 75th in General Classification Peace Race, Berlin, German Democratic Republik

1963 - 1st in Brighton Trophy Grand Prix, Brighton

1964 - 2nd in National Championship, Road, Northampton

1964 - 1st in All London Championship Road, Surrey

1965 - 3rd in Archer Grand Prix, Beaconsfield, London,

1965 - 1st in Stage 3 Huntsman Ales - Easter Four Day, Bournemouth

1966 - 1st in Croydon Premier Road Race, Surrey

1966 - 2nd in General Classification Streatham C.R.C. - Dover Two Day, Dover

1966 - 7th in Lincoln Grand Prix, Lincoln

In 1966 - he was selected for the England in the Road Race at the 1966 British Empire and Commonwealth Games in Kingston, Jamaica

References

1940 births
English male cyclists
Cyclists at the 1966 British Empire and Commonwealth Games
Living people
Commonwealth Games competitors for England